Van Orman or VanOrman is a surname. Notable people with the surname include:

Ray Van Orman (c. 1883 – 1954), American football and lacrosse coach and veterinarian
Suzanne VanOrman (born 1939), American politician
Thurop Van Orman (born 1976), American animator and voice actor
Ward Van Orman (1894–1978),  American engineer, inventor and balloonist
Willard Van Orman Quine (1908–2000), American philosopher and logician

Surnames of Dutch origin